The 5th Sarasaviya Awards festival (Sinhala: 5වැනි සරසවිය සම්මාන උලෙළ), presented by the Associated Newspapers of Ceylon Limited, was held to honor the best films of 1966 Sinhala cinema on July 5, 1967, at the Regal Cinema, Colombo, Sri Lanka. Honorable Minister of State J. R. Jayewardene and lady Elina Jayewardene were the chief guests at the awards night.

The film Delovak Athara received most nominations and awards at the ceremony.

Awards

References

Sarasaviya Awards
Sarasaviya